Pacific Bay Entertainment is an American film and television production company based in Santa Monica, California and launched in 1997 by Scott McAboy and Amy Sydorick. Their slate of film and television projects Include: Jinxed, Big Time Movie, The Boy Who Cried Werewolf, Swindle, Rags, Saved, Son of the Beach, A Fairly Odd Summer, Santa Hunters, Splitting Adam, Legends of the Hidden Temple, Rufus, Escape from Mr. Lemoncello's Library and Malibu Rescue.

Scott McAboy won Best Direction for the Children's Program category and Best Youth or Children's Program for Splitting Adam at the Leo Awards June 4, 2016. Amy Sydorick also won a Leo Award in 2015 for Best Youth or Children's Program for  Santa Hunters. Most recently, McAboy won a Leo Award (2018) for Best Direction and Sydorick won for Best Program for Escape from Mr. Lemoncello's Library.

For the last two decades, Pacific Bay Entertainment has worked with several studios including Universal Pictures, Paramount Pictures, 20th Century Fox, Imagine Entertainment, Warner Bros. and Netflix. Most recently Pacific Bay is producing the Netflix action films and series, Malibu Rescue.

Pacific Bay Entertainment has locations in Los Angeles and Vancouver.

Films
 Inferno (1998)
 The Apartment Complex (1999)
 The Burbs (2002) 
 Revenge (2007)
 Gym Teacher: The Movie (2008)
 Merry Christmas, Drake & Josh (2008)
 Spectacular! (2009)
 The Boy Who Cried Werewolf (2010)
 Best Player (2011)
 A Fairly Odd Movie: Grow Up, Timmy Turner! (2011)
 Big Time Movie (2012)
 Rags (2012)
 A Fairly Odd Christmas (2012)
 Swindle (2013)
 Jinxed (2013)
 A Fairly Odd Summer (2014)
 Santa Hunters (2014)
 Splitting Adam (2015)
 One Crazy Cruise (2015)
 Liar, Liar, Vampire (2015)
 Rufus (2016)
 Legends of the Hidden Temple (2016)
 Rufus 2 (2017)
 Escape from Mr. Lemoncello's Library (2017)
 Blurt! (2018)
 Malibu Rescue: The Movie (2019)
 Malibu Rescue: The Next Wave (2021)
 A Loud House Christmas (2021)

Television
 Team Knight Rider (1997–98)
 Son of the Beach (2000–03)
 Gigantic (2010–11)
 Malibu Rescue (2019-2021)

References

 Pacific Bay Entertainment Canada 
 Leo Awards Winners 2015
 Leo Award Winners 2016

External links
 Pacific Bay Entertainment website
 Kidscreen - Netflix Press Release for Malibu Rescue
 Deadline - Pacific Bay Entertainment
 Hollywood Reporter - Inside Voice
 Business Wire - Inside Voice
 Kidscreen - Inside Voice
 Worldscreen - Inside Voice
 TigerBeat - Inside Voice
 YSBnow - Inside Voice
 The Slanted - Inside Voice
 VR Focus - Inside Voice
 VR and Fun - Inside Voice
 Entertainment Weekly - Escape From Mr. Lemoncello's Library
 Kidscreen - Escape From Mr. Lemoncello's Library
 Business Wire - Escape From Mr. Lemoncello's Library
 Deadline - Escape from Mr. Lemoncello's Library
 Publishers Weekly - Escape From Mr. Lemoncello's Library
 Extra TV - Escape From Mr. Lemoncello's Library
 World Screen - Escape From Mr. Lemoncello's Library
 Nickelodeon Press Release - Legends of the Hidden Temple
 Nickelodeon Press Release - Splitting Adam
 TV by the Numbers Press Release - Rags
 TV by the Numbers Press Release - Big Time Movie
 Press Release - Big Time Movie
 Leo Award Winner 2016
 Malibu Rescue Season 2 Press Release

Film production companies of the United States
Television production companies of the United States